Miguel Alexandre Areias Lopes (born 2 June 1977), known as Areias, is a Portuguese former professional footballer who played mainly as a left-back.

Club career
After establishing himself as a professional player with S.C. Beira-Mar, Porto-born Areias joined Primeira Liga club FC Porto for the 2004–05 season but, after being rarely used, he was consecutively loaned for the duration of his contract: Boavista FC, Standard Liège (where he teamed up with former Portuguese internationals Sérgio Conceição and Ricardo Sá Pinto) and RC Celta de Vigo; arrived in January 2007 at the latter, he only managed one La Liga appearance during his short spell, a 0–2 home loss against RCD Espanyol.

Released, Areias signed with C.F. Os Belenenses on a free transfer, for the 2007–08 campaign. Unsettled, he switched the following year to newly promoted C.D. Trofense, also in the top division. After featuring rarely as the Lisbon side finished eighth, he could not help prevent the northern newcomers from being relegated in their first season ever.

In the summer of 2010, after one year out of football, the 33-year-old Areias signed with Leixões S.C. of the Segunda Liga. He left at the end of the season, having played less than one third of the league games for the Matosinhos-based team.

Areias retired in 2011, and started working immediately as a players' agent. He returned to Porto four years later, as youth coach.

References

External links

1977 births
Living people
Portuguese footballers
Footballers from Porto
Association football defenders
Primeira Liga players
Liga Portugal 2 players
Segunda Divisão players
Ermesinde S.C. players
A.D. Ovarense players
S.C. Beira-Mar players
FC Porto players
Boavista F.C. players
C.F. Os Belenenses players
C.D. Trofense players
Leixões S.C. players
Belgian Pro League players
Standard Liège players
La Liga players
RC Celta de Vigo players
Portuguese expatriate footballers
Expatriate footballers in Belgium
Expatriate footballers in Spain
Portuguese expatriate sportspeople in Belgium
Portuguese expatriate sportspeople in Spain